The 2013 end of year rugby tests, also known as the 2013 Autumn internationals in the Northern Hemisphere, were a series of international rugby union matches predominantly played between European sides - England, France, Ireland, Italy, Scotland and Wales, and visiting Southern Hemisphere countries - Argentina, Australia, Fiji, New Zealand, Samoa, South Africa and Tonga.

In 2013, a record 39 test matches took place, with a record 24 matches including a tier 2 or tier 3 side, six of which being a tier 1 v tier 2 fixture, as the IRB builds up to the 2015 Rugby World Cup.

Australia made their first tour of the Home Nations since 2009. However, they could not achieve a first Grand Slam since 1984 following their 20–13 defeat to England in the opening week of their tour. In addition, Australia played Italy in Turin for the first time. World cup winners New Zealand played France - for the fourth time in 2013, England and Ireland. South Africa played Wales, Scotland and France while Argentina played England, Wales and Italy.

Three invitational teams were in action against international teams during November. The Māori All Blacks visited Canada and the United States, while the French Barbarians faced Samoa. The Barbarians and Fiji contested the Killik Cup, which marked 100 years of rugby in Fiji.

As in other recent seasons, New Zealand and Australia played the third Bledisloe Cup match.

Test matches

Bledisloe Cup – 3rd test

Notes:
 Australia's 33 points was the highest ever score by a visiting team against New Zealand.
 Will Genia became just the third Australian scrum-half and the 39th Wallaby to reach 50 caps.
 Peter Betham made his international debut for Australia.

2–3 November

Notes:
 Dominic Bird, Frank Halai, Jeffery Toomaga-Allen and Luke Whitelock made their international debuts for New Zealand.
 This was the first test between the two teams to be played in Japan and outside the Rugby World Cup.

Notes:
 England reclaimed the Cook Cup.
 Joel Tomkins made his international debut for England.

8–10 November

Notes:
 Luke McLean earned his 50th cap for Italy.
 Tommaso Allan made his international debut for Italy and scored his first test try.

Notes:
 Santiago Cordero made his debut for Argentina.
 England won the Investec Challenge Cup, the first time the trophy has been contested.

Notes:
 South Africa retained the Prince William Cup.
 Frans Malherbe and Pieter-Steph du Toit made their international debut for South Africa.

Notes:
 This was Irelands biggest winning margin against Samoa.
 Jack McGrath and David Kearney, who scored two tries, made their debuts for Ireland, and Isaia Tuifua made his debut for Samoa.

Notes:
 New Zealand retained the Dave Gallaher Trophy.
 Richie McCaw became international rugby's most-capped captain, leading New Zealand for the 85th time in his 122nd test.
 Rabah Slimani made his international debut for France.

12–17 November

Notes:
 Martin Castrogiovanni and Sergio Parisse become the third and fourth Italian players to earn 100 caps.
 Michele Campagnaro made his international debut for Italy.
 Fiji's five yellow cards broke the record for the number of yellow cards by one team in an international match.

Notes:
 Dan Carter became the fifth All Black to earn 100 caps.
 Dylan Hartley earned his 50th cap for England, and Sam Whitelock earned his 50th cap for New Zealand.
 New Zealand regained the Hillary Shield after losing it in 2012.

Notes:
 Gethin Jenkins become the fourth Welsh player to earn 100 caps.
 Samson Lee and Cory Allen made their international debuts for Wales.
 Horacio Agulla earned his 50th cap for Argentina.
 This was Wales biggest winning margin over Argentina.

Notes:
 Sofiane Guitoune and Jonathan Pélissié made their international debuts for France.

Notes:
 Australia retained the Lansdowne Cup.

Notes:
 Jonny Gray made his international debut for Scotland.
 JP Pietersen earned his 50th test cap for South Africa.

22–24 November

Notes:
 Hallam Amos and Rhodri Williams made their international debuts for Wales.
 Wales head coach Warren Gatland coached his 100th international game; 59 for Wales, 38 for Ireland and 3 for the British and Irish Lions.

Notes:
 First ever win for Georgia over Samoa.

Notes:
 Kieran Low made his international debut for Scotland.
 Jim Hamilton earned his 50th test cap for Scotland.
 Australia reclaimed the Hopetoun Cup for the first time since 2006 after losing it in 2009 and having been unable to reclaim it in 2012.

Notes:
 New Zealand were undefeated in 2013, winning 14 from 14 matches, and became the first team in the professional era to win every match in a calendar year.

30 November

Notes:
 Fiji awarded caps for this match.
 The traditionally uncapped player of the Barbarians side was scrum-half TJ Perenara.
 Irish lock Mick O'Driscoll came out of retirement to cover the injured Eben Etzebeth; Etzebeth's original replacement, Flip van der Merwe, was not released for the game by 

Notes:
 Quade Cooper earned his 50th test cap for Australia.
 Australia won the James Bevan Trophy for the eighth time and for the sixth time in a row.
Israel Folau scored his 10th international try of the year in this match, equalling the Australian record.

17–21 December

See also
 2013 mid-year rugby union tests
 2013 Māori All Blacks tour of North America
 2013 Namibian Tri-Nations
 End of year rugby union tests
 Mid-year rugby union tests
 Serendib International Cup

References

External links
 Australia Grand Slam 2013
 Italy Autumn Test Confirmed
 Wales News ESPN
 France FFR.FR
 2013 end-of-year rugby union tests at ESPN
 
 Unión Argentina de Rugby

2013
2013–14 in European rugby union
2013 in Oceanian rugby union
2013 in North American rugby union
2013 in South American rugby union
2013 in African rugby union
2013–14 in Japanese rugby union